Billboard Top Rock'n'Roll Hits: 1964 is a compilation album released by Rhino Records in 1988, featuring ten hit recordings from 1964.

The album includes four songs that reached the top of the Billboard Hot 100 chart. The remaining six tracks each reached the Hot 100's Top 5.  In 1993, the album was re-issued and replaced two chart toppers ("Do Wah Diddy Diddy" & "Rag Doll") with two other songs, "Chapel of Love" (another Hot 100 chart topper) and the Top 5 hit "Under the Boardwalk."

Absent from the track lineup were songs by The Beatles, which had the year's No. 1 song of the year, "I Want to Hold Your Hand". A disclaimer on the back of the album stated that licensing restrictions made the Beatles' tracks unavailable for inclusion on the album. A similar licensing restriction would preclude songs by The Rolling Stones from being included on other volumes in the Rhino "Billboard Top Rock'n'Roll Hits" and "Billboard Top Hits" series.

Track listing
1988 original release

1993 re-release, replacement tracks

1988 compilation albums
Billboard Top Rock'n'Roll Hits albums
Pop rock compilation albums